The Yamalo-Nenets constituency (No.225) is a Russian legislative constituency covering the entirety of Yamalo-Nenets Autonomous Okrug.

Members elected

Election results

1993

|-
! colspan=2 style="background-color:#E9E9E9;text-align:left;vertical-align:top;" |Candidate
! style="background-color:#E9E9E9;text-align:left;vertical-align:top;" |Party
! style="background-color:#E9E9E9;text-align:right;" |Votes
! style="background-color:#E9E9E9;text-align:right;" |%
|-
|style="background-color:"|
|align=left|Vladimir Goman
|align=left|Independent
|
|26.19%
|-
| colspan="5" style="background-color:#E9E9E9;"|
|- style="font-weight:bold"
| colspan="3" style="text-align:left;" | Total
| 
| 100%
|-
| colspan="5" style="background-color:#E9E9E9;"|
|- style="font-weight:bold"
| colspan="4" |Source:
|
|}

1995

|-
! colspan=2 style="background-color:#E9E9E9;text-align:left;vertical-align:top;" |Candidate
! style="background-color:#E9E9E9;text-align:left;vertical-align:top;" |Party
! style="background-color:#E9E9E9;text-align:right;" |Votes
! style="background-color:#E9E9E9;text-align:right;" |%
|-
|style="background-color:"|
|align=left|Vladimir Goman (incumbent)
|align=left|Independent
|
|37.12%
|-
|style="background-color:"|
|align=left|Natalya Komarova
|align=left|Independent
|
|23.94%
|-
|style="background-color:"|
|align=left|Vera Tupoleva
|align=left|Independent
|
|9.06%
|-
|style="background-color:"|
|align=left|Irina Levchenko
|align=left|Liberal Democratic Party
|
|6.86%
|-
|style="background-color:"|
|align=left|Yury Strelnikov
|align=left|Independent
|
|6.78%
|-
|style="background-color:#FF8201"|
|align=left|Galina Motriyeva
|align=left|Christian-Democratic Union - Christians of Russia
|
|3.29%
|-
|style="background-color:#000000"|
|colspan=2 |against all
|
|11.92%
|-
| colspan="5" style="background-color:#E9E9E9;"|
|- style="font-weight:bold"
| colspan="3" style="text-align:left;" | Total
| 
| 100%
|-
| colspan="5" style="background-color:#E9E9E9;"|
|- style="font-weight:bold"
| colspan="4" |Source:
|
|}

1998
A by-election scheduled for 27 September 1998 was cancelled after all registered candidates withdrew.

1999

|-
! colspan=2 style="background-color:#E9E9E9;text-align:left;vertical-align:top;" |Candidate
! style="background-color:#E9E9E9;text-align:left;vertical-align:top;" |Party
! style="background-color:#E9E9E9;text-align:right;" |Votes
! style="background-color:#E9E9E9;text-align:right;" |%
|-
|style="background-color:"|
|align=left|Viktor Chernomyrdin
|align=left|Our Home – Russia
|
|48.07%
|-
|style="background:"| 
|align=left|Grigory Bystritsky
|align=left|Yabloko
|
|10.87%
|-
|style="background-color:"|
|align=left|Valery Tupolev
|align=left|Independent
|
|10.42%
|-
|style="background-color:"|
|align=left|Oleg Klementyev
|align=left|Communist Party
|
|7.81%
|-
|style="background-color:"|
|align=left|Sergey Zotov
|align=left|Independent
|
|2.91%
|-
|style="background-color:"|
|align=left|Sergey Bilkey
|align=left|Independent
|
|1.32%
|-
|style="background-color:"|
|align=left|Aleksandr Prokudin
|align=left|Independent
|
|1.22%
|-
|style="background-color:#000000"|
|colspan=2 |against all
|
|16.26%
|-
| colspan="5" style="background-color:#E9E9E9;"|
|- style="font-weight:bold"
| colspan="3" style="text-align:left;" | Total
| 
| 100%
|-
| colspan="5" style="background-color:#E9E9E9;"|
|- style="font-weight:bold"
| colspan="4" |Source:
|
|}

2001

|-
! colspan=2 style="background-color:#E9E9E9;text-align:left;vertical-align:top;" |Candidate
! style="background-color:#E9E9E9;text-align:left;vertical-align:top;" |Party
! style="background-color:#E9E9E9;text-align:right;" |Votes
! style="background-color:#E9E9E9;text-align:right;" |%
|-
|style="background-color:"|
|align=left|Natalya Komarova
|align=left|Independent
|
|73.30%
|-
|style="background-color:"|
|align=left|Eduard Panasyuk
|align=left|Independent
|
|4.78%
|-
|style="background-color:"|
|align=left|Boris Pakhirko
|align=left|Independent
|
|2.71%
|-
|style="background-color:#000000"|
|colspan=2 |against all
|
|17.23%
|-
| colspan="5" style="background-color:#E9E9E9;"|
|- style="font-weight:bold"
| colspan="3" style="text-align:left;" | Total
| 
| 100%
|-
| colspan="5" style="background-color:#E9E9E9;"|
|- style="font-weight:bold"
| colspan="4" |Source:
|
|}

2003

|-
! colspan=2 style="background-color:#E9E9E9;text-align:left;vertical-align:top;" |Candidate
! style="background-color:#E9E9E9;text-align:left;vertical-align:top;" |Party
! style="background-color:#E9E9E9;text-align:right;" |Votes
! style="background-color:#E9E9E9;text-align:right;" |%
|-
|style="background-color:"|
|align=left|Natalya Komarova (incumbent)
|align=left|United Russia
|
|70.43%
|-
|style="background-color:"|
|align=left|Anatoly Kudryashov
|align=left|Rodina
|
|9.01%
|-
|style="background-color:"|
|align=left|Viktor Ponomarenko
|align=left|Liberal Democratic Party
|
|3.80%
|-
|style="background-color:"|
|align=left|Oleg Klementyev
|align=left|Communist Party
|
|3.64%
|-
|style="background-color:"|
|align=left|Gennady Ivanov
|align=left|Independent
|
|2.08%
|-
|style="background-color:#000000"|
|colspan=2 |against all
|
|10.32%
|-
| colspan="5" style="background-color:#E9E9E9;"|
|- style="font-weight:bold"
| colspan="3" style="text-align:left;" | Total
| 
| 100%
|-
| colspan="5" style="background-color:#E9E9E9;"|
|- style="font-weight:bold"
| colspan="4" |Source:
|
|}

2016

|-
! colspan=2 style="background-color:#E9E9E9;text-align:left;vertical-align:top;" |Candidate
! style="background-color:#E9E9E9;text-align:leftt;vertical-align:top;" |Party
! style="background-color:#E9E9E9;text-align:right;" |Votes
! style="background-color:#E9E9E9;text-align:right;" |%
|-
|style="background-color:"|
|align=left|Grigory Ledkov
|align=left|United Russia
|
|63.68%
|-
|style="background-color:"|
|align=left|Denis Sadovnikov
|align=left|Liberal Democratic Party
|
|13.92%
|-
|style="background-color:"|
|align=left|Maksim Karpikov
|align=left|Communist Party
|
|4.92%
|-
|style="background:"| 
|align=left|Sergey Popov
|align=left|A Just Russia
|
|4.12%
|-
|style="background-color: " |
|align=left|Aleksey Kolesnikov
|align=left|Communists of Russia
|
|3.40%
|-
|style="background-color:"|
|align=left|Mikhail Ushakov
|align=left|Independent
|
|2.98%
|-
|style="background-color:"|
|align=left|Andrey Denisov
|align=left|Party of Growth
|
|2.67%
|-
|style="background-color:"|
|align=left|Sergey Noskin
|align=left|Rodina
|
|2.34%
|-
| colspan="5" style="background-color:#E9E9E9;"|
|- style="font-weight:bold"
| colspan="3" style="text-align:left;" | Total
| 
| 100%
|-
| colspan="5" style="background-color:#E9E9E9;"|
|- style="font-weight:bold"
| colspan="4" |Source:
|
|}

2021

|-
! colspan=2 style="background-color:#E9E9E9;text-align:left;vertical-align:top;" |Candidate
! style="background-color:#E9E9E9;text-align:left;vertical-align:top;" |Party
! style="background-color:#E9E9E9;text-align:right;" |Votes
! style="background-color:#E9E9E9;text-align:right;" |%
|-
|style="background-color:"|
|align=left|Dmitry Pogorely
|align=left|United Russia
|
|55.63%
|-
|style="background-color:"|
|align=left|Ivan Vershinin
|align=left|Liberal Democratic Party
|
|16.78%
|-
|style="background-color:"|
|align=left|Yelena Kukushkina
|align=left|Communist Party
|
|12.86%
|-
|style="background-color: " |
|align=left|Maksim Lazarev
|align=left|A Just Russia — For Truth
|
|8.12%
|-
|style="background-color:"|
|align=left|Andrey Drobot
|align=left|Rodina
|
|4.44%
|-
| colspan="5" style="background-color:#E9E9E9;"|
|- style="font-weight:bold"
| colspan="3" style="text-align:left;" | Total
| 
| 100%
|-
| colspan="5" style="background-color:#E9E9E9;"|
|- style="font-weight:bold"
| colspan="4" |Source:
|
|}

Notes

References

Russian legislative constituencies
Politics of Yamalo-Nenets Autonomous Okrug